The 2011 NEAFL season was the inaugural season of the North East Australian Football League (NEAFL). The season began on Saturday, 2 April and concluded on Saturday, 24 September with the NEAFL Grand Final.  were the Northern Division Champions after defeating  in the Northern Conference Grand Final, whilst  defeated the  reserves in the Eastern Conference Grand Final to become the Eastern Conference Champions. The Cross Conference Grand Final resulted in NT Thunder defeating Ainslie, ultimately resulting in becoming the 2011 NEAFL Premiers.

League structure
The league is split into two divisions called the North division and the East division. The North division comprises nine teams based in South East Queensland (five in Brisbane and four on the Gold Coast) as well as one based in the Northern Territory. The East division contains five teams based in the Australian Capital Territory and two based in Sydney. The top three teams from the 2010 QAFL and the top team from the 2010 AFL Canberra season all qualified for the Foxtel Cup.

Participating clubs

Regular season

Round 1

Round 2

Round 3

Round 4

Round 5

Round 6

Round 7

Round 8

Round 9

Round 10

Round 11

Round 12

Round 13

Round 14

Round 15

Round 16

Round 17

Round 18

Round 19

Round 20

Round 21

Round 22

Ladder

Finals series 
Eastern Conference

Northern Conference

Week 1

Week 2

Week 3

Week 4

Week 5

Foxtel Cup

Round of 16

Quarter-finals

Awards
Both polled 23 votes to be judged as the best and fairest players in the Northern Conference of the NEAFL.
Both players polled 16 votes to be judged as the best and fairest players in the Eastern Conference of the NEAFL.
The NAB NEAFL Rising Star Award is given to the player voted as the best rising star in the Northern Conference of the NEAFL.
The Gary Robb Rising Star Award is given to the player voted as the best rising star in the Eastern Conference of the NEAFL.

Best and fairest

Team of the year

Eastern Conference

Northern Conference

AFL draftees

N – national draft 
R – rookie draft

Footnotes
Notes
1. QLD zone selection acquired during the 2011 trade period.

References

External links
http://www.neafl.com.au/ Official NEAFL website

Australian rules football competition seasons
2011 in Australian rules football